Rudy Anthony Dawson Forbes (born May 8, 1988) is a Costa Rican professional soccer player for Sporting San Jose.

Career

Club

Puerto Rico FC
In May 2016, Dawson signed with NASL side Puerto Rico FC. He was released at the end of the 2017 season.

Career statistics

References

External links 
 

1988 births
Living people
Puerto Rico FC players
A.D. San Carlos footballers
Association football defenders
Liga FPD players
North American Soccer League players
Costa Rican men's footballers
Costa Rica under-20 international footballers
Costa Rica youth international footballers
People from Limón Province